Yattendon Castle was a fortified manor house located in the civil parish of Yattendon, in the hundred of Faircross, in the English county of Berkshire.

History

The site upon which Yattendon castle stood was originally occupied by a moated manor house. This house was held by Sir Richard Merbrook by the early 15th century. His daughter, Alice, married Sir John Norreys of Ockwells (d. 1 September 1466), a Knight of the Shire for Berkshire, and keeper of the wardrobe for Henry VI. The castle was then in the ownership of the Norreys family for over 200 years.

John and Alice's son, Sir William Norreys (1433 – 4 January 1507) later inherited the castle. He was among the army Henry VII brought from Brittany in 1485 and was present at the Battle of Bosworth.

The castle was probably the residence of William's eldest son Sir Edward Norreys (d. 1487) during his father's lifetime. Edward Norreys was the father of two sons: Sir John Norreys (1481 – 21 October 1564), who inherited the castle, but died without legitimate issue, and Sir Henry Norreys, who was beheaded in 1536 for his supposed affair with Anne Boleyn. The castle then passed to Edward's grandson, Henry Norris, 1st Baron Norreys (1525–1601), the son of the above-mentioned Sir Henry Norreys. Henry Norreys was a lifelong friend of Elizabeth I and was the father of six sons, who included Sir John Norreys, a famous English soldier.

The castle was largely destroyed by Parliamentary forces during the English Civil War. A new manor house was built on the site in 1785. Traces of the moat can still be seen today.

Royal visitors
Henry VIII and Catherine of Aragon were visitors at Yattendon Castle in 1520. While there, it is said that the Queen's lady-in-waiting, Anne Boleyn, of whom the King was already enamoured, dropped her handkerchief during a dance. It was retrieved by Sir Henry Norreys. This incident, later referred to as "Queen Anne's Dance", would be used as evidence, during Anne and Norreys trials, to support rumours of their affair.
Princess Elizabeth stayed at Yattendon Castle on her way to imprisonment at Woodstock.
Anne of Denmark visited Yattendon, probably in September 1603.

See also
Castles in Great Britain and Ireland
List of castles in England

References

External links
David Nash Ford’s Royal Berkshire History: Yattendon Castle
The Gatehouse
National Gazetteer of Great Britain and Ireland (1868)

Castles in Berkshire
Yattendon